Ryad Merhy (born 28 November 1992) is an Ivorian-born Belgian professional boxer who held the WBA (Regular) cruiserweight title from 2021 to 2022.

Professional career

Early career
Born to an Lebanese father and a Ivorian mother, Merhy made his professional debut against Hrvoje Bozinovic on 29 June 2013. He won the fight by a second-round knockout. Merhy amassed a 17-0 record during the next two years, with 14 of those victories coming by way of stoppage, before he was fighting for his first professional title. Merhy faced Sylvera Louis for the vacant WBC Silver International cruiserweight title on 19 December 2015, at the RTL Spiroudome in Charleroi, Belgium. He won the fight by a sixth-round knockout.

WBA Inter-Continental champion
Merhy challenged Williams Ocando for the WBA Inter-Continental cruiserweight title on 21 May 2016. The twelve-round title bout was scheduled as the main event of an RTL broadcast card that took place at the RTL Spiroudome in Charleroi, Belgium. Merhy won the fight by a sixth-round technical knockout. He first staggered Ocando with a left hook, before unloading with a flurry of punches which forced referee Jan Christensen to wave the fight off.

After successfully clinching his second professional title, Merhy fought in two non-title bouts. Merhy faced Giorgi Tevdorashvili on 15 October 2016. He beat the over-matched Tevdorashvili by a sixth-round technical knockout. Two weeks later, on 1 November, Merhy beat Tamas Bajzath by a third-round technical knockout.

Merhy made his first WBA Inter-Continental title defense against Max Alexander on 17 December 2016. The fight was once again scheduled as the main event of an RTL broadcast card that took place at the RTL Spiroudome in Charleroi, Belgium. He won the fight by an eleventh-round knockout. Merhy made his second title defense against Mitch Williams on 20 May 2017, at the same venue and location as his previous two title fights. He won the fight by unanimous decision, with scores of 119-109, 119-109 and 118-110. Merhy made his third title defense against Nick Kisner on 16 December 2017, and was once again broadcast by RTL from the RTL Spiroudome. He won the fight by a fourth-round knockout.

Merhy faced the undefeated #1 ranked WBA cruiserweight contender Arsen Goulamirian for the vacant WBA interim cruiserweight title on 24 March 2018. The title fight was scheduled as the main event of a Canal+ broadcast card, and took place at the Palais des Sports in Marseille, France. oulamirian won the fight by a technical knockout, stopping Merhy with a combination of unanswered strikes in the eleventh round, after dominating the fight from the very first round.

Pre-title fights
Merhy was scheduled to face Soso Abuladze on 29 June 2018. He successfully bounced back from his first professional loss with a sixth-round knockout victory. Merhy next faced Demetrius Banks on 20 October 2018. He won the fight by unanimous decision, with scores of 79-74, 80-73 and 80-73.

Merhy faced the 21-4 Samuel Clarkson for the vacant WBA International cruiserweight title on 15 December 2018. The bout was scheduled as the event headliner, and took place at the RTL Spiroudome in Charleroi, Belgium. He won the fight by a fourth-round knockout. Merhy next faced Cesar David Crenz on 4 May 2019. He won the fight by a third-round knockout.

WBA world cruiserweight champion

Merhy vs. Szellő
Merhy was scheduled to fight Imre Szellő for the vacant WBA interim cruiserweight title on 19 October 2019. The title bout took place at the RTL Spiroudome in Charleroi, just as almost all of his previous title bouts, excepting his fight with Goulamirian. Merhy captured the interim title with a seventh-round knockout of Szellő. The fight was stopped at the 2:10 minute mark of the round, after Merhy had knocked Szellő down twice in the seventh and once in the sixth round.

On January 19, 2021, the WBA withdrew its recognition of the incumbent WBA (Regular) cruiserweight champion Beibut Shumenov, following 30 months of inactivity from him. Accordingly, interim titleholder Ryad Merhy was then promoted to world status, while the current world champion Arsen Goulamirian was promoted to "Super" champion status. As such, Merhy became Belgium’s first boxing champion.

Merhy vs. Zhang
After promoting him to world status, the WBA ordered Merhy to make his first title defense against former champion Yuniel Dorticos. However, as Dorticos failed to respond to an offer to fight in Belgium, the WBA allowed Merhy to make a voluntary title defense against the IBO cruiserweight champion Kevin Lerena. The bout was expected to take place on July 17, 2021, at the King Baudouin Stadium in Brussels, Belgium. Larena announced his withdrawal from the fight on June 24, due to a hand injury he had suffered in sparring. Larena was replaced by the #14 ranked WBA cruiserweight contender Zhaoxin Zhang, who stepped in on a two-weeks notice. Merhy won the fight by an eight-round technical knockout. He dropped Zhang with a heavy left hook midway through the round, and although Zhang managed to get up, referee Oliver Brien deemed him unable to continue fighting.

Cancelled fight vs. Makabu
On February 3, 2022, it was announced that Merhy would make his second WBA world title defense against the 2016 Olympics gold medalist Evgeny Tishchenko. The bout was scheduled for March 26, and was expected to take place at the RCC Boxing Academy in  Yekaterinburg, Russia. The fight was cancelled following the 2022 Russian invasion of Ukraine.  Merhy was instead booked to face the WBC champion Ilunga Makabu in a title unification bout on September 30, 2022, at the Stade des Martyrs in Kinshasa, Congo. On July 19, 2022, Merhy was ordered by the WBA to face their "Super" cruiserweight champion Arsen Goulamirian in a title consolidation bout. He was given 24 hours to accept the fight, and 30 days to organize it should he accept. On August 8, Merhy revealed he might eschew both of those fights and move up to bridgerweight, as he felt he could no longer comfortably make the cruiserweight limit. Merhy refused to face Goulamirian in the letter of resignation sent to the WBA on August 12. This resulted in him being stripped on the Regular cruiserweight title.

Professional boxing record

See also
List of cruiserweight boxing champions

References

External links

 

1992 births
Living people
Cruiserweight boxers
World cruiserweight boxing champions
World Boxing Association champions
Belgian male boxers
Ivorian male boxers
Belgian people of Lebanese descent
Black Belgian sportspeople
Belgian people of Ivorian descent
Ivorian people of Lebanese descent
Ivorian emigrants to Belgium
Sportspeople of Lebanese descent